This is a list of notable persons who are alumni of Stanford Graduate School of Business in California.

Alumni

Business

Jon Abbott, President and CEO of WGBH Educational Foundation
Stephen Adams, businessman and private equity investor
Andrew Agwunobi, healthcare administrator and interim president of the University of Connecticut
Javed Ahmed, Pakistani American businessman
Herbert M. Allison, businessman, former President and CEO of Fannie Mae
Mukesh Ambani, Billionaire Indian Businessman Chairman of Reliance industries
Phil Knight, Billionaire Founder and Chairman of Nike
Mary Barra, Chairman and CEO of General Motors
Robert Bass, billionaire businessman
Sid Bass, investor and billionaire
Riley P. Bechtel, former Chairman of the Bechtel Corporation
Stephen Bechtel Jr., billionaire co-owner of the Bechtel Corporation
Jeffrey Bewkes, Chairman and CEO of Time Warner
Roelof Botha, venture capitalist, Sequoia Capital global head
Orlando Bravo, billionaire co-founder and managing partner of private equity firm Thoma Bravo
Carlos Brito, CEO of Anheuser-Busch InBev
Bill Browder, American-born British financier
John Browne, Baron Browne of Madingley, British businessman
Brook Byers, senior partner at Kleiner Perkins Caufield & Byers
Yvon Chouinard, environmentalist and founder of Patagonia
Bud Colligan, American entrepreneur
James C. Collins, American business consultant, author, and lecturer
Joe Coulombe, American entrepreneur
James Coulter, billionaire co-founder of private equity firm TPG Capital
 Sir Howard Davies, Chairman of the Royal Bank of Scotland and the former Director of the London School of Economics
John Donahoe, American businessman and CEO of Nike, former president of ServiceNow and former CEO of Bain and Company and eBay
Andy Dunn, American entrepreneur and CEO of Bonobos Inc.
Richard Fairbank, American billionaire businessman and founder of Capital One
Thomas J. Falk, CEO of Kimberly-Clark
Anna Fang, venture capitalist, CEO of ZhenFund
Robert J. Fisher, American businessman
Pete Flint, British entrepreneur
Sarah Friar, CEO of Nextdoor and former CFO of Block (formerly Square) 
Marcos Galperin, billionaire Argentine businessman and co-founder of MercadoLibre, Inc.
Dana Gioia, American poet and writer
Seth Godin, American author and former dot com business executive
Robert E. Grady, American venture capitalist and private equity investor
Wyc Grousbeck, American businessman and owner of the Boston Celtics
Rene Haas, American tech industry executive, CEO of Arm Ltd.
Ole Andreas Halvorsen, billionaire Norwegian-born investor, hedge fund manager, and philanthropist
Richard B. Handler, American businessman and CEO of Jeffries Group
Tom Hayhoe, British healthcare figure
Nathan Hubbard, American businessman and music executive
Jessica Jackley, American entrepreneur and co-founder of Kiva
Kenneth M. Jacobs, chairman and chief executive officer of Lazard
Jeff Jordan, American venture capitalist at Andreessen Horowitz
Jim Jorgensen, American entrepreneur
Lynn Jurich, American businessperson and CEO of Sunrun
Vinod Khosla, billionaire Indian American engineer and businessman
Darren Kimura, American businessperson and inventor of Micro-Concentrating Solar 
Omid Kordestani, Iranian-born American businessman
David Korten, American author and political activist
Richard Kovacevich, American businessperson and former CEO of Wells Fargo & Company
Gary Kremen, American entrepreneur and inventor of online dating
Tom Linebarger, CEO of Cummins
Edmund Wattis Littlefield, American businessman and philanthropist
Stephen J. Luczo Executive Chairman of Seagate
Mathew Martoma (born 1974 as Ajai Mathew Mariamdani Thomas), hedge fund portfolio manager, convicted of insider trading
 Sir Deryck Maughan, British businessman and philanthropist
John B. McCoy, businessman
Henry A. McKinnell, business executive and former CEO of Pfizer Inc.
Scott McNealy, businessman and co-founder of Sun Microsystems
Alex Michel, businessman and first star of The Bachelor
Steve Miller, American businessman and chairman at AIG
Hamid Moghadam, American businessman
John Morgridge, American businessman
Mariam Naficy, American entrepreneur and founder of Minted
Jacqueline Novogratz, American entrepreneur and author
Tom Peters, American writer on business management practices
Donald Petersen, American businessman at Ford Motor Company
David Pitt-Watson, Scottish author and businessperson
Ken Powell, American businessman and CEO of General Mills
Laurene Powell Jobs billionaire widow of Apple, Inc. co-founder Steve Jobs
Michele Raffin, American aviculturist
Richard Rainwater, billionaire American investor and fund manager
Charles R. Schwab, billionaire American investor and founder of the Charles Schwab Corporation
Mayo A. Shattuck III, American businessman
David Siminoff, American investor
Ellen Siminoff, American investor
Jeffrey Skoll, billionaire Canadian engineer, internet entrepreneur and film producer
Steven Smith, American astronaut
Thomas O. Staggs, former COO of the Walt Disney Company
Tom Steyer, American billionaire hedge fund manager
David Sze, entrepreneur, investor, and managing partner at the venture capital firm Greylock Partners
Alan Tripp, American entrepreneur
Kevin Tsujihara, American businessman and former chairman and CEO of Warner Bros. Entertainment
Miles D. White, American entrepreneur
Sam Yagan, American entrepreneur and co-founder of OkCupid
Lee Hsien Yang, Singaporean business executive
Lorenzo Zambrano, Mexican businessman
Tristan Walker, American entrepreneur

Government 
Anthony Gonzalez, American football wide receiver and member of Congress
John F. Kennedy, 35th President of the United States of America
Jim Kolbe, American politician and member of Congress
Woody Myers, Indiana state health commissioner
Penny Pritzker, American billionaire businesswoman and United States Secretary of Commerce (2013–2017)
Lim Swee Say, Singaporean politician
Rishi Sunak, Prime Minister of the United Kingdom (2022–present)
Steve Westly, American venture capitalist and California State Controller (2003–2007)
Dennis Yao, former member of the Federal Trade Commission (FTC)
Hidehiko Yuzaki, Japanese politician

Military 

Paul Bucha, American war veteran
Antonio Buehler, American war veteran and activist for the right to film the police

References

External links

Stanford Graduate School of Business alumni